Kingston/Riverland Aerodrome  is located  north of Kingston, Ontario, Canada.

References

Registered aerodromes in Ontario
Transport in Kingston, Ontario